Huevo is the Spanish-language translation of the word "egg", but can also be used as a Spanish slang term for "testicle".

Huevo(s) may also refer to:

Food
 Chorizo con huevos, a popular Mexican dish consisting of fried chorizo with scrambled eggs
 Huevos a la mexicana, a popular Mexican breakfast dish
 Huevos estrellados, or "Huevos rotos", a Spanish dish
 Huevos motuleños, a Mexican dish that originated from Motul, Yucatán
 Huevos pericos, a Colombian/Venezuelan dish
 Huevos rancheros, another Mexican dish served during breakfast
 Machacado con huevo, or "Huevos con machaca", a dish of scrambled eggs mixed with machaca that's said to have originated from Ciénega de Flores
 Shakshouka, a Maghrebi dish also called "Huevos a la flamenca"
 Torta de huevo, a torta filled with scrambled eggs

Entertainment
Golden Balls (film), or "Huevos de oro", a 1993 Spanish film
Huevos (album), a studio album created by Meat Puppets
Huevos (film series), a series of animated films produced in Mexico, produced by Huevocartoon
Otra Película de Huevos y un Pollo, a 2009 animated film
Una Película de Huevos, a 2006 animated film
Un gallo con muchos huevos, a 2015 computer animated film
Un rescate de huevitos, a 2021 computer animated film
Huevos Rancheros (band), a former Canadian indie rock band which were active from 1990 to 2000

Other
Huevos (island), an island in the Republic of Trinidad and Tobago
Manolo Cabeza de Huevo, a series of famous Spanish prank calls by the radio show El Vacilón de la Mañana